Sikkim Express is an English daily newspaper published from Gangtok, Sikkim, India.
It is the oldest and largest circulated English daily newspaper in Sikkim.
The news paper started as weekly in 1976 and converted as daily in 2003 and it is the first English newspaper of Sikkim state. It won Best Small Newspaper (English) in India at All India Conference of Small and Medium Newspaper in 1986.

References

External links
 

Mass media in Sikkim
1976 establishments in Sikkim
English-language newspapers published in India
Publications established in 1976